Auvillers-les-Forges is a commune in the Ardennes department in the Grand Est region of northern France.

Geography
Auvillers-les-Forges is located some 27 km west by north-west of Charleville-Mézières and 22 km east by south-east of Hirson. Access to the commune is by the European route E44 from Maubert-Fontaine in the east which passes through the north of the commune intersecting the D877 in the commune and continuing to Hirson in the west. Access to the village is by the D877 from Éteignières in the north which passes through the length of the commune and the village and continues south to Champlin. The D20 goes south-east from the village to Girondelle. Apart from the village there is the hamlet of Le Chateau-Vert north-east of the village. There is a large forest in the north of the commune (the Bois d'Auviller-les-Forges) but the rest of the commune is farmland.

The river Sormonne flows through the commune from west to east just north of the village and continues east to join the Meuse at Charleville-Mézières. The Ruisseau de Saint-Rémy rises just west of the village and flows south-west to join the Orvaux east of Fontenelle.

Neighbouring communes and villages

Heraldry

Administration

List of successive mayors

Demography
In 2017 the commune had 877 inhabitants.

See also
Communes of the Ardennes department

References

External links
Auvillers-les-Forges on Géoportail, National Geographic Institute (IGN) website 
Auvillers-les-Forges on the 1750 Cassini Map

Communes of Ardennes (department)